Travis Adrian Chapman (born June 5, 1978) is an American former professional baseball third baseman, who played one game in Major League Baseball (MLB) for the Philadelphia Phillies in .

Playing career
Chapman attended Bishop Kenny High School in Jacksonville, Florida. He enrolled at Mississippi State University, where he played college baseball for the Mississippi State Bulldogs. He played collegiate summer baseball with the Orleans Cardinals of the Cape Cod Baseball League in 1998. He was drafted by the Phillies in the 17th round of the 2000 Major League Baseball draft and played his first professional season with the Batavia Muckdogs of the New York-Penn League. 

The Phillies promoted Chapman to the major leagues on September 2, 2003. He appeared in one MLB game, on September 9, 2003, against the Atlanta Braves. He pinch hit for Tomás Pérez in the seventh inning against Braves pitcher Jung Bong and flew out to right field. Chapman finished the game at third base.

Chapman spent seven seasons in the minor leagues with the Phillies, Kansas City Royals, Cincinnati Reds, and Pittsburgh Pirates organizations before retiring after the 2006 season. In 1,771 career minor league at bats, he hit .286, with 41 home runs.

Coaching career
Chapman became coach with the New York Yankees farm team, the Charleston RiverDogs and coached in the team's minor leagues in a variety of capacities for several years.

After the 2021 season, the Yankees promoted Chapman to the major league coaching staff as their first base and infield coach.

References

External links

Major League Baseball third basemen
Philadelphia Phillies players
Florida Complex League Phillies players
Batavia Muckdogs players
Clearwater Phillies players
Reading Phillies players
Scranton/Wilkes-Barre Red Barons players
Arizona League Royals players
Wilmington Blue Rocks players
Sarasota Reds players
Mesa Desert Dogs players
Gulf Coast Pirates players
Altoona Curve players
1978 births
Living people
Minor league baseball managers
Bishop Kenny High School alumni
Baseball players from Jacksonville, Florida
Mississippi State Bulldogs baseball players
Orleans Firebirds players